Omorgus mutabilis is a species of hide beetle in the subfamily Omorginae and subgenus Afromorgus.

References

mutabilis
Beetles described in 1954